Jeremy Francis Gilmer (February 23, 1818 – December 1, 1883) was an American soldier, mapmaker, and civil engineer most noted for his service as the Chief Engineer of the Confederate States Army during the American Civil War. As a major general, he oversaw the planning of the elaborate defenses of the city of Atlanta, Georgia.

Early life
Gilmer was born in Guilford County, North Carolina on February 23, 1818. He entered the army corps of engineers as a second lieutenant upon his graduation from the United States Military Academy at West Point, New York on July 1, 1839. He ranked fourth in a graduating class that included future fellow Civil War generals Halleck, Canby, Hunt, and Ord. He was an assistant professor of engineering at West Point until June 1840, when he was reassigned to New York City where he was assistant engineer in the construction of Fort Schuyler in New York Harbor.

Gilmer served in the Mexican War as Chief Engineer of the Army of the West in the New Mexico Territory and helped design and construct Fort Marcy in Santa Fe. He also surveyed battlefields near Mexico City.

Assigned to Georgia, he superintended the improvement of the Savannah River and the construction of Fort Jackson and Fort Pulaski.

Until 1861, he was active in making surveys, constructing fortifications in various locations including San Francisco, California, and executing various river and harbor improvements.

Civil War
Upon the outbreak of the Civil War, he left California, and entered the Confederate service. He was appointed on March 16, 1861 as a Confederate lieutenant of engineers. He resigned from the U.S. Army on June 29, 1861. He soon became chief engineer on the staff of General A. S. Johnston as a lieutenant colonel. Gilmer was severely wounded in his right arm at the Battle of Shiloh, where Johnston was killed. After his recovery in Georgia, Gilmer was promoted to chief engineer of the Department of Northern Virginia in early August 1862. He was stationed at Richmond with the rank of brigadier general.

On August 25, 1863, Gilmer was given a temporary appointment to the grade of major general. He was appointed Chief of the Engineer Bureau for the Confederacy. He spent time overseeing the defenses of Charleston, South Carolina, although he was still plagued by recurring health problems from his Shiloh wound. Concerned that the vital rail and manufacturing center of Atlanta would be targeted by Union forces, he commissioned Atlanta businessman and entrepreneur Lemuel P. Grant to develop a plan to ring the city with forts and earthworks along all the key approaches. These elaborate defenses would prove difficult to seize in frontal assaults, forcing the Union army to lay siege to Atlanta in the summer of 1864.

Gilmer helped improve the defenses of Mobile, Alabama, in June and July. He returned to Richmond in July 1864 and spent the rest of the war there as Chief of the Engineer Bureau.

Post-War career
After the war, from 1867–1883 Gilmer was president and engineer of the Savannah Gas Company. He was also a director of the Georgia Central Railroad.

Death
Jeremy F. Gilmer died from heart disease in Savannah, Georgia, and is buried in the city's Laurel Grove Cemetery.

See also

 List of American Civil War generals (Confederate)

Notes

References
 Eicher, John H., and David J. Eicher, Civil War High Commands. Stanford: Stanford University Press, 2001. .
 Sifakis, Stewart. Who Was Who in the Civil War. New York: Facts On File, 1988. .
 Warner, Ezra J. Generals in Gray: Lives of the Confederate Commanders. Baton Rouge: Louisiana State University Press, 1959. .
 Wright, Marcus J., General Officers of the Confederate Army: Officers of the Executive Departments of the Confederate States, Members of the Confederate Congress by States. Mattituck, NY: J. M. Carroll & Co., 1983. . First published 1911 by Neale Publishing Co.

External links

 
 Gilmer Civil War Maps Collection at the University of North Carolina

American civil engineers
American military personnel of the Mexican–American War
United States Military Academy alumni
Confederate States Army major generals
People of North Carolina in the American Civil War
People from Savannah, Georgia
1818 births
1883 deaths
United States Army officers